DeWitt High School is a comprehensive public high school located in De Witt, Arkansas, United States.  The school provides secondary education for students in grades 9 through 12. DeWitt is one of two public high schools in Arkansas County, Arkansas and the sole high school administered by the DeWitt School District.

History 
  In 2009 Gillett High School closed, and students were consolidated into DeWitt High.

Service area 
Its territory includes areas in Arkansas, Jefferson, and Desha counties.

The municipalities it serves include DeWitt, Almyra, Gillett, Saint Charles, and Humphrey.

Additionally the district includes unincorporated areas: Arkansas Post, Bayou Meto, Crocketts Bluff, Eldridge Corner, Ethel, Nady, One Horse Store, Point Deluce, Reydell, Stinking Bay, and Tichnor.

Academics 
DeWitt High School is accredited by the Arkansas Department of Education (ADE) and the assumed course of study follows the Smart Core curriculum developed by the ADE, which requires students complete at least 22 units prior to graduation. Students complete regular coursework and exams and may take Advanced Placement (AP) courses and exam with the opportunity to receive college credit.

Athletics 
The DeWitt High School mascot and athletic emblem is the dragon with blue and gold serving as the school colors.

The DeWitt compete in interscholastic activities within the 4A Classification via the 4A Region 8 Conference, as administered by the Arkansas Activities Association. The Dragons field teams in football, golf (boys/girls), basketball (boys/girls), cheer, bowling (boys/girls), cross country (boys/girls), track and field (boys/girls), baseball, and fastpitch softball.

References

External links 
 

Public high schools in Arkansas
Schools in Arkansas County, Arkansas
High School